The State Quarry, Iowa Men's Reformatory is a nationally recognized historic district located northwest of Anamosa, Iowa, United States. It was listed on the National Register of Historic Places in 1992.  At the time of its nomination the district consisted of five resources, including three contributing buildings, one contributing site, and one contributing structure.  This was the second quarry operated by the Anamosa prison.  The first was opened in 1872 near Stone City in 1872, and it was exhausted by 1877.  They acquired two  parcels here in 1878 and another the following year.  The stone quarried and dressed on site by the prisoners was used to build the prison and sold to other government agencies in the state for their building purposes.  None of the stone was placed on the open market.  The Chicago and North Western Railroad provided a connection to transport the materials.  The last of the usable building stone was quarried in 1915, when they shifted to crushed gravel.  The quarry remained in operation until 1943.

The historic buildings were built between 1904 and 1938.  They are all stone structures built in a simplified Romanesque Revival style.  The influence of the style is found in the "heavy massing, texture of the stone, and the window, door, and corner treatments."  The buildings were built for the following uses: dining hall (1905), tool house (1905), and the scale house (1938).  The Pratt truss bridge across Buffalo Creek, the contributing structure, was built in 1912.

References

Quarries in the United States
Romanesque Revival architecture in Iowa
Buildings and structures in Jones County, Iowa
Historic districts in Jones County, Iowa
National Register of Historic Places in Jones County, Iowa
Industrial buildings and structures on the National Register of Historic Places in Iowa
Historic districts on the National Register of Historic Places in Iowa